West Riverfront station (formerly Joe Louis Arena) is a Detroit People Mover station in downtown Detroit, Michigan. It is located on Steve Yzerman Drive across from the former site of the Joe Louis Arena, near the intersection of 3rd Street and Jefferson Avenue, where M-10 terminates.

Prior to the Joe Louis Arena's closure in 2017, the station was directly connected to the arena and its parking garage via pedestrian bridges from the concourse level. The bridge to the arena was demolished with the arena, and the bridge to the now-disused garage is closed, though the Detroit City Council plans to reopen the garage in the future. The station is still connected to the Riverfront Towers by an enclosed skybridge. It is the nearest station to the Downtown campus of the Wayne County Community College District, and also serves the Detroit Riverwalk via its street entrance, accessible by an elevator or a series of concrete ramps.

The People Mover shut down temporarily on March 30, 2020, due to decreased ridership amid the COVID-19 pandemic. Following the arena's demolition, the station was renamed West Riverfront when it reopened with the system's restart on May 20, 2022. As of June 2022, the trains' automated announcements still announce the station as "Joe Louis Arena."

See also

 List of rapid transit systems
 List of United States rapid transit systems by ridership
 Transportation in metropolitan Detroit

References

External links
 DPM station overview
Steve Yzerman Drive entrance from Google Maps Street View

Detroit People Mover stations
Railway stations in the United States opened in 1987
1987 establishments in Michigan